Charles Gunn is a fictional character created by Joss Whedon for the television series, Angel and introduced by writer Gary Campbell in the episode "War Zone".  The character is portrayed by J. August Richards, and was named by Whedon after filmmaker James Gunn and actor Sean Gunn, both of whom had worked with Whedon. 

Gunn is introduced as the leader of a street gang which protects its neighborhood from vampires.

Biography

Character history
Gunn was born and raised in the Badlands, an environment of poverty and violence. He had to be strong and resourceful in order to protect his sister, Alonna, from the dangers of the city.. Although he had a few brushes with the law, he acted as a modern day Robin Hood to keep the streets in his neighborhood safe. In his teens (although now Gunn is in his early 20s), Gunn rose through the ranks to become the leader of a group of street-fighters who protect their turf from vampires using guerrilla tactics. Possessing the mind of a military strategist and the strength of a brawler, life in the city hardened Gunn to the extent that his life became less important than the cause, resulting in him trading his soul for a truck in a deal with a demon named Jenoff when he was only seventeen, because he believed he had no future (cf. "Double or Nothing").

Angel Investigations
Gunn is introduced in the Season One episode "War Zone", when he observes the vampire Angel roughing up a blackmailer and tries, unsuccessfully, to dust him. Later on, a gang of vampires, who are at war with Gunn's group, attack their hideout, kidnapping several group members in the process, including Gunn's sister Alonna. Eventually, Angel wins Gunn's trust, but unfortunately, not in time to save Alonna from being turned into a vampire. Gunn has no choice but to stake his own sister, a decision which continues to haunt him through the series. It is this loss that forces Gunn to question his own motives and become more receptive to Angel's help, realizing he cannot do everything alone. Angel recognizes Gunn's strength and often calls on him if he needs back up in battle or if he needs protection for the people he cares about when he cannot protect them himself. Although he initially regards his time with Angel Investigations as a "paying side-gig," Gunn eventually becomes a full-time member of the gang, gaining mutual respect for those he fights side-by-side with while finding his place in the world.  However, his work with his new 'family' often leads to conflicted loyalties; in the episode "Belonging", Cordelia is accidentally sucked into a portal to Pylea while a member of Gunn's old street crew, George, succumbs to the bite of a vampire. Gunn feels responsible for his friend's death, believing that it would not have happened if he had still been around to help in the fight.  Yet even in his grief, he realizes that he could not commit the same crime twice and allow Cordelia to suffer the same fate, so he joins Angel, Wesley, and Lorne to rescue her.

A short time after their return from Pylea, demons across the city are being massacred - regardless of whether or not they actually did anything to deserve being killed in the first place - and Gunn comes to the conclusion that his old gang is responsible for the deaths, currently being led by a man named Gio, who has a serious grudge against supernatural entities due to an unrevealed event in his past (cf. "That Old Gang of Mine"). He realizes that his ties with his old life are gone and that his loyalty now lies with the vampire with a soul. In a showdown with one of his lifelong friends, Gunn finally chooses the mission of the Angel Investigations team.  Without realizing it, Gunn finds the future he thought he would never have. He has friends, loyalty, respect, and a mission to pursue. He even finds love in the arms of the new girl Fred Burkle, but his past still comes back to haunt him in the episode "Double or Nothing," when the demon Jenoff decides it is time to cash in on a deal made years earlier by claiming Gunn's soul.  The Angel Investigations are able to defeat Jenoff.

Fred becomes the most important person in Gunn's world, and in "Supersymmetry", he kills Professor Seidel (who deliberately sent Fred to Pylea) in order to save Fred from having to carry the burden of doing it herself.  The guilt of what he had done for her plagues Fred and instead of bringing them closer together, it begins the rift that leads to the end of their relationship.  Although no longer romantically linked, Gunn and Fred continue to fight side-by-side, and Gunn has a fling with the electric Gwen Raiden in the episode "Players".  When Wolfram & Hart want to cut a deal to have Angel take over the L.A. branch, Gunn is led into the mysterious White Room where he is exposed to the mysterious conduit to the Senior Partners, who impresses Gunn with his immense power. Soon, he undergoes a remarkable transformation at Wolfram & Hart.

Wolfram & Hart
Feeling undervalued by his friends, Gunn submits to a procedure at the hands of Wolfram & Hart's Medical Department that enhances his mind with a comprehensive understanding of the law (and Gilbert & Sullivan, to help improve his voice and diction), making him the only member of Angel's team who can work inside the system seamlessly (cf. "Conviction"). When his mental abilities begin to diminish, Gunn, fearful of losing his new talents and respect, makes a pact with Dr. Sparrow and gets a permanent upgrade in exchange for signing to release an ancient curio stuck in customs. When this curio results in the death of Fred and the resurrection of Illyria (cf. "A Hole in the World"), a guilt-ridden Gunn willingly offers himself to take Lindsey McDonald's place in a hell dimension in order to obtain information on how to stop the Senior Partners (cf. "Underneath"). While the team have no clue how to free him, Illyria saves Gunn with ease. He then returns to the fold, changed and seeking redemption for his sins. In the show's finale "Not Fade Away", he spends his potential-last day alive helping Anne Steele out at her youth help center, and then slays Senator Helen Brucker, one of the members of the Circle of the Black Thorn, but is seriously injured in the process. While preparing for one last fight against the army of the Senior Partners, Illyria states that he has only minutes to live with Gunn quoting, "Then let's make them memorable."  Joss Whedon later discussed the final battle in SFX Magazine: "Gunn is dead. Illyria fights on. Angel loses an arm. Spike gets Shanshu. And Xander loses another eye, which is funny, because he isn't even there."

J. August Richards later revealed in an interview that Gunn was intended to have become a vampire either in Angel season six or the proposed Spike spin-off movie had either project gone ahead: "I’d probably have him come back as a vampire and then kill himself," "That’s always how I wanted it to end for my character".

After the Fall
In issue one of the Angel: After the Fall comic series (which is the canonical continuation of the Angel series), Gunn and a group he has assumed leadership of storm a stadium and kill Kr'ph, one of the demon lords of L.A., who has taken up residence there.  The group frees humans, who were forced to fight each other by the demon. Gunn then makes a suggestive comment to the demon's female captives. At the end of the issue, Gunn is revealed to be a vampire, having been turned either during or after Team Angel's battle with the Senior Partners' army at the end of "Not Fade Away", who feeds on the women and turns the "rescued" men into vampires as part of "Team Gunn".

However, in the second issue, Gunn insists that he is still a good guy. He resents being a vampire, though he is prone to murderous impulses due to his lack of a soul.  He reveals that he blames Angel for his condition, believing he had allowed him to be turned, and that he intends to save L.A. to prove that one doesn't need a soul to be a champion. As part of his plans, he kidnaps the psychic fish Betta George and imprisons him, forcing George to tap into his psychic ability to freeze Slayers in their tracks and contact people outside of Hell/Los Angeles.

In a later issue, he is seen making mystical plans; the intent is to have Angel come to the conclusion he sent Gunn to die, then Angel himself will die moments later.  As part of his revenge against Angel, Gunn destroys the Wolfram & Hart building, Angel's headquarters in the war with the Demon Lords, which also forces Wesley back to the Senior Partners for a short time. Gunn later bears witness to Angel's defeat of the Lords, hanging back to ensure that not all of the people are slaughtered should Angel fail. Shortly after the team moves back into the Hyperion Hotel, Gunn confronts them and reveals his vampire nature.

Upon seeing what has become of Gunn, Angel tells him he is sorry.  Gunn says he figured he would say that, and tells him to table that for now. Gunn takes Angel around his base of operations, explains what happened to him.  When Angel sees that Gunn thinks he is doing the right thing, Angel cautions him that the beast is the one in control, not him.  Gunn attacks him, angered that Angel thinks that Gunn isn't himself.  Gunn proceeds to remove all of the magic that had kept Angel alive, and realizes that Angel was actually now a human.  Gunn decides to let Angel lie there and die slowly, only to be confronted by Wesley's "ghost", who reveals to him that the visions he has been receiving are from the Senior Partners rather than the Powers That Be. Ignoring this revelation, Gunn continues to attack his former friends, his team of Slayers apparently staking Spike- although Spike is later seen alive thanks to Illyria's timeslips- before he is kicked out of a window by Connor while trying to kill Angel again. Confronting Illyria, he tricks her into transforming into Fred so that he can shoot her, reverting her to her true form in the hope that he can convince her to use her powers to rewind time so that the Fall never occurs, only for Illyria to vow to unmake time itself. Realizing that the Senior Partners cannot allow him to die, Angel provokes Gunn into killing him, thus forcing the Senior Partners to reverse time to the original battle in the alleyway, giving Angel the opportunity to save Gunn before he is sired, the group subsequently taking Gunn to the hospital, where he falls into a coma. In Aftermath #18 Gunn is shown driving a sports car. Gunn seems to be recovering from his wound well, but was stated not to be ready to rejoin the team yet.  In Aftermath #23 Gunn is spotlighted. It is explained how he was cured so quickly from the attacks at the end of the series and he and Illyria come to a mutual agreement and strike a friendship of sorts. In the end Illyria and Gunn take off to find adventure, slay demons, and find a new direction in their lives.

Gunn eventually returns to Angel Investigations, though he nonetheless faces multiple difficulties upon his return, as Spike and Connor still regard him as a traitor due to his actions in Hell and are distrustful of him. When Connor takes over the leadership of Angel Investigations after Angel is captured by Innovation Labs, a biotech company seeking to duplicate Angel's status as an immortal with a soul, Gunn, while still loyal to Angel's mission, left the team due to escalating disagreements and arguments with Connor. Gunn departs with the intent of starting his own crew and fighting the good fight his way, though he nonetheless intends to return when Angel is found. However, his attempts to start anew are briefly halted when he is attacked by Eddie Hope, an ice-manipulating devil who has been hunting down people for crimes they committed while Los Angeles was in Hell, while at a diner.

In the Angel & Faith series Gunn reconvenes with Angel, Faith and Willow after they come to LA from London in the Family Reunion arc. Gunn has been sending reports to Angel on Connors normal life as well as updating him on the status of his other friends from LA. Gunn stays in the Hyperion Hotel to protect the tear in reality when the other four enter Qour'toth. He appears pleased at the positive place Angel and Connors' relationship has finally reached.

Powers and abilities
In the television series, Gunn is a normal human with no supernatural abilities, but he has strength and martial arts expertise due to his years as a vampire hunter, often described as "the muscle" of Angel Investigations. Episodes such as "Darla" and "Reunion" have proven that Gunn is also a talented and intelligent investigator. In Season Five, he is given a "legal upgrade" by Wolfram & Hart which gives him knowledge of all legal codes, both human and demon, as well as fluency in some demonic languages, knowledge of golf techniques and all Gilbert & Sullivan light operas. In the canonical comic book Angel: After the Fall, Gunn is depicted as having become a vampire, acquiring superhuman strength, speed, reflexes durability, virtual immortality, accelerated healing, vulnerability to holy items and sunlight and the necessity to feed on blood to maintain vitality. He claims that his "inner demon" is partially subdued by his earlier Wolfram & Hart upgrade. By devouring a prophetic demon, Gunn also acquired its power to receive visions, which he believes come from the Powers but in fact come from the Senior Partners. At the end of the series, time is reversed, and Gunn is an ordinary human again.

Gunn is a fan of pop culture and often displays a detailed knowledge regarding comic books:
In the episode "Supersymmetry", Gunn threatens a college student in a school bookstore by referencing the specific issue of Daredevil (#181) in which Bullseye kills Elektra, even quoting from the cover blurb which reads "...One wins, one dies."
When commenting on how fast Illyria appears to move when using her time-warping abilities, Gunn compares her to three different incarnations of the Flash: Jay Garrick, Wally West, and Barry Allen. The reference elicits little response from his confused friends, so he merely says that it was "like she was movin' really fast".
Despite Gunn's knowledge of comic books, in the episode, First Impressions, he claims that, "I haven't bothered to see a movie since Denzel was robbed of the Oscar," referring to Denzel Washington's portrayal of Malcolm X.

Appearance
Following his mental upgrade, Gunn sheds his street look for the sleek, professional suits of a legal powerhouse. He also lets his hair grow slightly, having had it shaved in all previous seasons, which comes as a surprise to Cordelia in the episode "You're Welcome". In the final episodes, Gunn comes full circle, returning to his roots, taking back his street clothes, and reawakening his purpose as a soldier in the fight against evil.

Relationships

Romantic interests
 Veronica — Gunn had a romance with this girl prior to becoming a full-time member of Angel Investigations.  She appears briefly in the "First Impressions", in which her non-fatal injury at the hands of a vampire brings back painful memories and feelings of guilt about Alonna.
 Winifred "Fred" Burkle — Gunn and Fred fall in love and continue a strong relationship throughout much of Seasons Three and Four, which was ruptured when Gunn murdered a human being in order to protect Fred's innocence.  Nevertheless, he retains strong feelings of friendship for her and is devastated by her death, for which he is partially responsible.  Unlike the other characters, who usually referred to Gunn by his surname, Fred always called him Charles and continued to do so following their break-up.
 Gwen Raiden flirts with Gunn in her first two appearances, and they have sex in the episode "Players" when, with Gunn's assistance, Gwen gains the ability to touch people without harming them.

Friendships
 Wesley Wyndam-Pryce — During Angel's temporary absence from the group in Season Two, Gunn and Wesley develop a brothers-in-arms bond. This friendship continues to develop, but is strained by romantic rivalry over Fred (cf. "Waiting in the Wings"). The friendship between Gunn and Wesley deteriorates further after Wesley misguidedly attempts to kidnap Angel's son Connor and is accordingly fired from the agency.  However, in Season Four, Wesley is gradually reintroduced to the AI team and the pair are friends again by Season Five.  The Beast's attack on Los Angeles requires Wes and AI to join forces, and Wes saves Gunn's life in their first confrontation with the creature.  Unfortunately, this friendship is again put under stress when the creation of Illyria (for which Gunn is indirectly responsible) causes Fred's death; Wesley stabs Gunn with a scalpel. The pair eventually reconcile.
 Cordelia Chase advocated bringing Gunn into "Team Angel", and pushes for him to start getting paid as well as making sure the team begins to see him as an equal. Gunn quickly began to respect her and not just think of her as a "Barbie doll" as he did in the beginning. Over the years a solid friendship was formed.

Appearances

Canonical appearances
Gunn has appeared in 95 canonical Buffyverse appearances.
Angel Gunn was a series regular from seasons 2 - 5.  He appeared in 91 episodes in total, including guest appearances in the episodes:
Season 1 (1999–2000) - "War Zone", "Blind Date", and "To Shanshu in L.A."

Angel: After the Fall Gunn has appeared in issues #1, #2, #4, #5, #8–#17, #23 and Angel: Aftermath #18

Non-canonical appearances
Gunn has also appeared in Angel expanded universe material such as comics and novels, most notable his own one-shot comic Gunn: Spotlight in 2006.

References

Angel (1999 TV series) characters
Fictional African-American people
Fictional characters from Los Angeles
Fictional American lawyers
Fictional vampire hunters
Fictional private investigators
Fictional characters who have made pacts with devils
Buffyverse vampires
Television characters introduced in 2000
Fictional demon hunters
Fictional sororicides
American male characters in television
Fictional occult and psychic detectives